Skin graft may refer to:

Skin grafting, a medical procedure
Skin Graft Records, a record company
Skin Graft: The Adventures of a Tattooed Man, a 1993 Vertigo comic book limited series